Raven Cliff Falls may refer to:

 Raven Cliff Falls (Georgia), White County, Georgia, United States
 Raven Cliff Falls (South Carolina), Greenville County, South Carolina, United States